In zoology, a club is a bony mass at the end of the tail of some dinosaurs and of some mammals, most notably the ankylosaurids and the glyptodonts, as well as meiolaniid turtles. It is thought that this was a form of defensive armour or weapon that was used to defend against predators, much in the same way as a thagomizer, possessed by stegosaurids, though at least in glyptodonts it is hypothesized it was used in fighting for mating rights. Among dinosaurs, the club was present mainly in ankylosaurids, although sauropods like Shunosaurus also possessed a tail club. The tail club is most often depicted on Ankylosaurus, especially in encounters with larger predators such as Tyrannosaurus. Victoria Arbour has established that ankylosaurid tails could generate enough force to break bone during impacts. In a separate study, Arbour suggested tail clubs as well as large armoured herbivores as a whole evolve when animals are too large to hide and too small to avoid predation by size alone.

See also
Thagomizer

References

Mammal anatomy
Dinosaur anatomy